Mulgrave-et-Derry, is a village north of Mayo, in the Papineau Regional County Municipality, Quebec, Canada. The region includes a number of notable lakes, including Gull Lake, Hawk Lake, Lady Lake, Smallian Lake, Lac St. Sixte, Lac La Blanche and Little Lake. Community buildings include the Hill and Gully Riders Snowmobile Club, St. Matthew's Evangelical Lutheran Church, and Our Lady of Light Roman Catholic Church (now Our Lady of Light Cultural Centre).

The Wallingford-Back mine, once one of Canada's largest sources of quartz, is located in Mulgrave-et-Derry. It became a tourist destination after ceasing operations in the 1970s, but also became unsafe; in 2017, it was barricaded.

Demographics

References

External links

http://ca.epodunk.com/profiles/quebec/mulgrave-et-derry/2001563.html
http://www.bytown.net/mayoquebec.htm

Municipalities in Quebec
Incorporated places in Outaouais